The Linsum Bridge is a bridge in Kampung Linsum at Rantau, Negeri Sembilan, Malaysia which crossing Simin River. The 50 metre bridge is currently the world's longest single span ultra-high performance ductile concrete (UHPdC) bridge as the first of its kind in the country.

Bridges completed in 2011
Bridges in Negeri Sembilan
Seremban District